The 2016 Gold Coast Titans season was the 10th in the club's history. Coached by Neil Henry and co-captained by Nathan Friend and William Zillman, the Titans are currently competing in the NRL's 2016 Telstra Premiership. They also competed in the 2016 NRL Auckland Nines tournament.

Season summary

Milestones
 Round 1: Chris McQueen, John Olive, Tyrone Roberts, David Shillington and Ashley Taylor made their debuts for the club.
 Round 1: Nathan Davis and Leivaha Pulu made their first grade debuts.
 Round 1: John Olive scored his first career try.
 Round 2: Nathan Davis scored his first career try.
 Round 3: Tyrone Roberts played his 100th career game.
 Round 3: Ashley Taylor scored his first career try.
 Round 6: Cameron Cullen made his first grade debut and scored his first career try.
 Round 6: Anthony Don played his 50th career game.
 Round 8: Luke Douglas played his 100th game for the club.
 Round 11: Nathan Peats made his debut for the club.
 Round 12: Luke Douglas played his 250th career game.

Squad list

Squad movement

Gains

Losses

Re-signings

Fixtures

Pre-season

NRL Auckland Nines

The NRL Auckland Nines is a pre-season rugby league nines competition featuring all 16 NRL clubs. The 2016 competition was played over two days on the 6 & 7 February at Eden Park. The Titans featured in the Piha pool and played the Raiders, Sharks and Dragons. The club finished top of their pool and along with the Raiders qualified for the Quarter-Finals. They were eventually eliminated by the New Zealand Warriors (4 – 22) in the Semi-Finals. Agnatius Paasi and Chris McQueen were named in the Team of the Tournament.

The Titans' squad for the tournament was:
  Greg Bird, Lachlan Burr, Nathan Davis, Anthony Don, Brian Kelly, Greg Leleisiuao, Jeff Lynch, Nene Macdonald, Chris McQueen, David Mead, Daniel Mortimer, Agnatius Paasi, Nathaniel Peteru, Tyrone Roberts, Matt Srama, Ashley Taylor, Shannon Walker and Shane Wright.

Regular season

Finals

Ladder

Statistics

Representatives
The following players have played a representative match in 2016.

References

Gold Coast Titans seasons
Gold Coast Titans season